Traci Koster (born June 15, 1985) is an attorney and politician who is the state representative for District 64 in Florida. A Republican, she was elected in 2020. The district covers parts of Hillsborough County and Pinellas County.

Early life and education 
Born in Greensboro, North Carolina, Koster was raised in Pinellas and Hillsborough County, Florida. She graduated from Tarpon Springs High School. She earned a Bachelor of Science degree in legal studies from the University of Central Florida and a Juris Doctor from the Stetson University College of Law. Koster is a family law attorney.

Political career 
When incumbent Republican J. W. Grant resigned from the Florida House after being appointed Florida's chief information officer by Governor Ron DeSantis, Republican leaders in Pinellas and Hillsborough Counties designated Koster as Grant's replacement on the 2020 ballot. In the November general election, Koster defeated Democratic nominee Jessica Harrington.

Elections

References

External links

Living people
Republican Party members of the Florida House of Representatives
Politicians from Tampa, Florida
Florida lawyers
People from Greensboro, North Carolina
People from Pinellas County, Florida
People from Hillsborough County, Florida
1985 births
University of Central Florida alumni
Stetson University College of Law alumni
21st-century American politicians
Women state legislators in Florida
21st-century American women politicians